John Barrett Hasted (17 February 1921 – 4 May 2002) was a British physicist and folk musician.

Biography
Hasted was born in Woodbridge, Suffolk. He attended Winchester College and won a choral scholarship to New College, Oxford, where he read chemistry and later focused on atomic physics.

From 1968 until his retirement he was head of experimental physics at Birkbeck College, London. He was the author of Physics Of Atomic Collisions (1964), Aqueous Dielectrics (1973), The Metal Benders (1981), and his autobiography, Alternative Memoirs (1992).

He was also active as a folk singer, folk club organiser, and leading light of the Second British Folk Revival.

Parapsychology

Hasted was a believer in psychokinesis. He endorsed the spoon bending feats of Uri Geller and other alleged psychics. A 1987 report by the United States National Academy of Sciences investigated the paranormal claims of Hasted and chided him for his naiveté for playing into the hands of anyone intending on deceiving him. The report wrote that the conditions of his 1974 tests with Geller did not rule out the possibility of trickery.

Hasted believed that children could paranormally bend paper clips inside a glass sphere, provided the sphere had a hole in it and they were allowed to take the sphere into a room unobserved. Science writer and skeptic Martin Gardner wrote that Hasted was incapable of devising simple controls such as videotaping the children secretly. Stephen North, a British psychic, was tested by Hasted in the late 1970s. Hasted claimed North had the psychokinetic ability to bend spoons and teleport objects in and out of sealed containers. According to James Randi, during a test conducted by Hasted at Birkbeck College, North was observed to have bent a metal sample with his bare hands. North was tested in Grenoble on 19 December 1977 in scientific conditions and the results were negative.

The physicist John Taylor reviewed The Metal Benders (1981) for New Scientist. According to Taylor, the metal bending tests had poor controls and Hasted was not in the same room as the subjects for some of the tests. Taylor wrote that "not only are the tests not watertight but the conjectured theory is monumentally silly." Hasted suggested in the book that paranormal effects arise through telepathy from the individual in a parallel universe.

Publications
Physics Of Atomic Collisions (1964) 
Aqueous Dielectrics (1973)
The Metal Benders (1981)
Alternative Memoirs (1992)

References

1921 births
2002 deaths
Academics of Birkbeck, University of London
British physicists
English folk musicians
Parapsychologists